Deh Now (also known as Deh Now-e ’ājjī Hedāyat, Deh Now-ye Bālā, and Deh Now-ye Fāẕelī) is a village in Chah Varz Rural District, in the Central District of Lamerd County, Fars Province, Iran. At the 2006 census, its population was 1,458, in 268 families.

References 

Populated places in Lamerd County